Jeevan Sangram is a 1974 Indian Hindi-language drama film. It follows passengers aboard the Komagata Maru and is based on subsequent events about Indian immigrants to Canada in the early 20th-century.

Cast 
Shashi Kapoor as Arjun
Jalal Agha
Iftekhar as Police Inspector
Padma Khanna  as Allah Rakhi
Manmohan
 Tarun Bose as Kirpal
Ram Mohan as Abdul Police
Murad
Radha Saluja as Amba
Asit Sen
Tun Tun
Om Shivpuri

Music 
"Aaj Ki Aaj Sunaaoon Yaaron Kal Ki Sunna Kal" – Asha Bhosle, Mahendra Kapoor
"Main Tere Desh Ki Ladki Tu Mere Desh Ka Ladka" – Asha Bhosle, Usha Mangeshkar
"Meri Zindagi Tumhaare Pyaar Pe Qurbaan Ho" – Narendra Chanchal
"Meri Zindagi Tumhaare Pyaar Pe Qurbaan Ho" v2 -Narendra Chanchal
"Meri Zindagi Tumhaare Pyaar Pe Qurbaan Ho" v3 – Narendra Chanchal
"O Laagi Laagi Yaari Hamaari" – Lata Mangeshkar

References

External links 
 

Films scored by Kalyanji Anandji
1974 films
1970s Hindi-language films
1974 drama films
Indian films based on actual events
Hindi-language films based on actual events